Tabitha's Secret was an American rock band formed in March 1990 in Orlando, Florida. It was originally composed of lead vocalist Rob Thomas, John Goff and Jay Stanley on guitar, Brian Yale on bass (Colin Chrisman was the original bass player), and Chris Smith playing drums. In September 1990, Paul Doucette joined the band as a second percussionist, only to replace Chris Smith entirely a year later. Some of the band's most popular songs were "And Around", "Dear Joan", "Unkind", "Forever December", "Paint Me Blue", and "3 A.M." The group is best known as a precursor to Matchbox Twenty, which was formed by Thomas, Yale, and Doucette after the breakup of Tabitha's Secret.

History

The Split
In 1995 the band interviewed several managers and selected Kevin O'Malley, then manager of Spider Monkey, a regional band enjoying a great deal of success at the time, to represent them. O'Malley immediately connected the band with a publicist, agent Chris Tanner out of Nashville and several record company reps including Kim Stephens, a promotions and A&R rep for Atlantic Records. Kim Stephens brought the band's demo to Jason Flom, then President of Atlantic's Lava sub-label. O'Malley arranged a showcase at Potbelly's in Tallahassee, FL and Flom was sold on the band's material, which included the future hit "3 A.M." Kevin O'Malley's brother John, Jay Stanley and John Goff financed a new recording session in Atlanta which yielded recordings of new material (the songs Tired, and Swing) as well as refreshed versions of "Forever December" and "3 A.M."

Also that year, songwriter/producer and representative for Atlantic Records, Matt Serletic, approached the members of Tabitha's Secret concerning a long-term record deal with his production company, Melisma, which neither Jay Stanley nor John Goff were interested in, believing that it would be better to sign an album deal directly with the label and not with Serletic's company. However, Serletic pressed on with his desire to sign the band. It is commonly believed that Serletic was more interested in helping Thomas find his voice than he was in the band Tabitha's Secret. In spite of objections from Stanley, Rob Thomas decided to take the offer.

Stanley and Goff's refusal to sign a long-term production contract, along with alleged pressure from the record company to drop the two guitar players, convinced Thomas to leave the band and take the deal for himself. Stanley continued to operate Tabitha's Secret as a business; however, Goff signed over his interest in the Tabitha's Secret business to Stanley in 1998 and started his own company, separate from Stanley.

Serletic's own personal manager and accountant were installed to handle Thomas's affairs. Shortly after, Thomas, Yale, and Doucette signed a seven-record deal with Atlantic Records. Atlantic Records introduced the trio to two guitarists: Adam Gaynor (Serletic knew Adam from his time at Criterion Studios in South Florida with Collective Soul) and Kyle Cook (Serletic grew up two houses from Cook in Stone Mountain, Georgia). With Cook on lead guitar and Gaynor on rhythm guitar, the five formed Matchbox Twenty.

Meanwhile, Stanley and Goff continued to capitalize on Tabitha's Secret where they could, releasing an album in 1997 of the band's recordings from 1993 to 1995. They later released a live album and remastered the band's original EP.

Lawsuit
In 1997, guitarists Jay Stanley and John Goff filed a lawsuit against Thomas, Yale, Doucette, and Serletic, along with attorney David Mantel. The lawsuit alleged that Serletic approached the band about a long term agreement and the production of a self-title/self-published EP, which included the track "3 A.M.", and then agreed to represent that band to Atlantic Records. However, when Stanley and Goff had reservations, Thomas unilaterally fired the band's manager and agent, cancelled their tour and announced the band was breaking up. The lawsuit claimed fiduciary breach of contract against the former bandmembers and tortious interference against Serletic and his attorney. This lawsuit lasted three years and was settled out of court in 2000.

Recordings
The first recording released by Tabitha's Secret was a self-titled and self-published EP featuring the name "Tabitha's Secret?" and original artwork by Perry Souza.

The first post-breakup Tabitha's Secret album was entitled "Don't Play With Matches" (a thinly-veiled reference to Stanley's ex-bandmates), released in 1998.

The next recording, in 2000, was entitled Live, and features recordings from Tabitha's Secret's shows.

In 2001, Jay Stanley joined with Tony Miceli and George Spatta to re-mix, re-master and overdub the original recordings from the self-titled EP, much to Thomas's disapproval.

Jay Stanley released new Tabitha's Secret material, titled the "Vault(s) 1, 2 and 3".

Band members

Former members
Rob Thomas – lead vocals (March 1990 – 1995)
John Goff – guitar, backing vocals (March 1990 – 1995)
John "Jay" Stanley – guitar, backing vocals (March 1990 – 1995)
Brian Yale – bass guitar (March 1990 – 1995)
Paul Doucette – drums, percussion (September 1990 – 1995)
Chris Smith – drums, percussion (March 1990 –September 1994)
Colin Chrisman – bass guitar (March 1993)

Additional personnel
• Joey Fowler -- Promoter, party host (1993 - 1994)

Mike Pilarski – instrument tech, roadie (March 1990 – 1995)
Matt Serletic – songwriter, producer, representative (1995)
Kevin O'Malley - personal manager (1995)
Chris Tanner - booking agent (1995)

Discography

Albums
Don't Play with Matches (1997)
Live (1999)
Tabitha's Secret? (2001)
The Vault Vol.1 (2007)
The Vault Vol.2 (2007)
The Vault Vol.3: The Covers (2007)

References

Musical groups from Orlando, Florida
Alternative rock groups from Florida
Jam bands
Musical groups established in 1993
Musical groups disestablished in 1995